Jean Carlos da Silva Ferreira (born 3 March 1982), or simply Jean or Jean Carlos, is a Brazilian football striker.

Honours
Flamengo
Taça Guanabara: 2004
Campeonato Carioca: 2004

América
 Campeonato Carioca Série B: 2015

External links
 
zerozero.pt 
 Guardian Stats Centre
netvasco 

1982 births
People from São Gonçalo, Rio de Janeiro
Sportspeople from Rio de Janeiro (state)
Living people
Brazilian footballers
Association football forwards
CR Flamengo footballers
Cruzeiro Esporte Clube players
FC Saturn Ramenskoye players
CR Vasco da Gama players
Sport Club Corinthians Paulista players
Fluminense FC players
Sharjah FC players
Santos FC players
Brasiliense Futebol Clube players
Volta Redonda FC players
America Football Club (RJ) players
Madureira Esporte Clube players
Macaé Esporte Futebol Clube players
Esporte Clube Rio Verde players
Uberlândia Esporte Clube players
Campeonato Brasileiro Série A players
Campeonato Brasileiro Série B players
Campeonato Brasileiro Série C players
Russian Premier League players
UAE Pro League players
Brazilian expatriate footballers
Expatriate footballers in Russia
Brazilian expatriate sportspeople in Russia
Expatriate footballers in the United Arab Emirates
Brazilian expatriate sportspeople in the United Arab Emirates